General William Frost Nuthall  (1818–1902) was a senior officer in the Indian Staff Corps.

Biography

Nuthall joined the British Army, where he served for 49 years in the Bengal Infantry seeing many years in British Burma. He took part in the Second Anglo-Burmese War (1852–53), where he drew together three outpost of the Arracan Battalion in the Aeng Pass, with which he surprised and captured the summit of the pass. He received the thanks of the Governor-General for his services several times.

In the early 1870s he was major-general and posted in Manipur when he signed despatches relating to the Services of the Munipore Contingent During the Looshai Expedition of 1871-72.

He was promoted to major-general on 2 November 1868, to lieutenant-general on 1 October 1877, and to general on 15 February 1880.

He died in Kensington on 10 December 1902, and was buried in London.

Family
Nuthall married twice, first to Ellen Wood (1826–1889), daughter of James Wood, of Calcutta; secondly to a daughter of General Beckwith Baker. There were children of the first marriage.

Notes

1818 births
1902 deaths
British Indian Army generals
Indian Staff Corps officers